King of Pro-Wrestling (2013) was a professional wrestling pay-per-view (PPV) event promoted by New Japan Pro-Wrestling (NJPW). The event took place on October 14, 2013, in Tokyo at Ryōgoku Kokugikan and featured ten matches (including one dark match), four of which were contested for championships. It was the second event under the King of Pro-Wrestling name.

Storylines
King of Pro-Wrestling featured ten professional wrestling matches that involved different wrestlers from pre-existing scripted feuds and storylines. Wrestlers portrayed villains, heroes, or less distinguishable characters in the scripted events that built tension and culminated in a wrestling match or series of matches.

Event
Alex Shelley was scheduled to wrestle at the event, teaming with Kushida to challenge for the IWGP Junior Heavyweight Tag Team Championship, however, he was forced to pull out after suffering a back injury. Shelley and Kushida were replaced in the title match by Taichi and Taka Michinoku, who would ultimately go on to defeat the Forever Hooligans (Alex Koslov and Rocky Romero) and become the new champions. The third match on the pay-per-view, saw Hiroyoshi Tenzan wrestle his return match from a rib injury and rookie Takaaki Watanabe his final match before leaving for a learning excursion to the United States. The event featured Kota Ibushi's first match under a NJPW contract, Tetsuya Naito successfully defending the NEVER Openweight Championship and his status as the number one contender to the IWGP Heavyweight Championship against former partner Yujiro Takahashi as well as outside participation from Pro Wrestling Noah representative Naomichi Marufuji, who unsuccessfully challenged Shinsuke Nakamura for the IWGP Intercontinental Championship. The event also featured an appearance by Daniel Gracie and Rolles Gracie, who announced that they were going to be taking part in Wrestle Kingdom 8 in Tokyo Dome in January 2014. In the main event Kazuchika Okada successfully defended the IWGP Heavyweight Championship against Hiroshi Tanahashi, who vowed to pull himself out of the Heavyweight title picture as a result.

Reception
For the second year in a row, the main event of King of Pro-Wrestling received a five-star rating from sports journalist Dave Meltzer.

Results

References

External links
The official New Japan Pro-Wrestling website

2013
2013 in professional wrestling
October 2013 events in Japan
Professional wrestling in Tokyo
2013 in Tokyo